Standard is an unincorporated community in Tuolumne County, California, United States that lies  east-southeast of Sonora. Its post office, opened in 1910, is assigned ZIP code 95373. Standard was established as a company town for the Standard Lumber Company.  Standard was a station on the Sierra Railway.  Although the railroad is gone, the depot has survived and is currently in use as a nursery (19071 Standard Road) and a grocery (19073).

References

Unincorporated communities in Tuolumne County, California
Unincorporated communities in California